Group Captain Francis Victor Beamish,  (27 September 1903 – 28 March 1942) was a Royal Air Force fighter pilot and flying ace of the Second World War. After flying during the Battle of Britain he continued to lead fighter operations until he was killed in action in 1942.

Early life
Beamish was born at Dunmanway, County Cork on 27 September 1903 the son of Francis George Beamish and Mary Elizabeth Beamish. He attended Coleraine Academical Institution.

Royal Air Force career
Beamish entered the RAF College, Cranwell as a flight cadet on 14 September 1921. After graduation in August 1923 he was granted a permanent commission as pilot officer on 15 August 1923, and posted to 4 (Army Co-operation) Squadron at RAF Farnborough on 18 September 1923. In January 1925 Beamish was posted to the RAF School of Army Co-operation at Old Sarum for a brief posting before being promoted flying officer on 15 February 1925, joining No. 31 Squadron RAF at Ambala, India on 18 November 1925. He transferred to No. 60 Squadron RAF at Kohat in April 1926. Returning to England in October 1926 Beamish participated in a course at the Central Flying School, RAF Wittering before commencing a tour as an instructor at No. 5 Flying Training School, RAF Sealand.

Beamish played rugby union for Harlequins, Leicester, Hampshire, Royal Air Force and Irish Trials for several years. He was the eldest of the Beamish brothers who were all accomplished sportsmen and RAF officers; his brothers being George, Charles and Cecil.

On 16 September 1927 Beamish returned to RAF Cranwell as a member of the staff and promoted flight lieutenant on 12 December 1928,  He was posted to Canada on 22 March 1929 on exchange with an RCAF officer. Returning two years later he was posted to No. 25 Squadron RAF at RAF Hawkinge as a Flight Commander. In January 1932 he was appointed Personal Assistant to the AOC at RAF Uxbridge. In 1933 he was admitted to hospital at Uxbridge, due to tuberculosis, having to relinquish his commission on 18 October 1933 due to ill-health.

In 1934 Beamish secured a civilian post at No. 2 Flying Training School RAF Digby which he held until appointed civilian adjutant at RAF Aldergrove on 18 May 1936 simultaneously being granted a commission as flight lieutenant in the Reserve of Air Force Officers. A notice in the London Gazette in February 1937 recorded that Flight Lieutenant Francis Victor Beamish (RAF retired) had been reinstated on the active list as a flight lieutenant with effect from 27 January 1937 (with seniority dated 23 March 1932, having relinquished his commission with the Reserve of Air Force Officers,  Having recovered his health he was reinstated with full flying status and posted to command No. 2 Armament Training Camp and then Meteorological Flight at RAF Aldergrove. He was appointed to command No. 64 Squadron RAF at RAF Church Fenton on 8 December 1937.

Squadron Leader Beamish served as Honorary Aide-de-Camp representing the Royal Air Force on the staff of the Governor of Northern Ireland from 6 April 1937 until 6 January 1938,

Beamish was awarded the Air Force Cross on 1 January 1938, for his work in the formation of the "Met Flight".

Wartime service

Beamish completed a course at RAF Staff College, Andover and was appointed to command No. 504 Squadron RAF at RAF Digby on 13 September 1939 before sailing to Canada in January 1940 on staff duty, he was Mentioned in Despatches on 20 February 1940 for his service in command,. Beamish was promoted Wing Commander on 1 March 1940, and returned to England assuming command of RAF North Weald on 7 June 1940.

As evidenced by his tally as a fighter pilot he took every opportunity to fly operationally. On 18 June 1940 he claimed two Messerschmitt Bf 109s destroyed, on 9 July 1940 one Messerschmitt Bf 110 damaged, then on 12 July 1940 a Dornier Do 17 bomber shot down.  In action during the height of the Battle of Britain on 18 August 1940 Beamish claimed a probable Junkers Ju 88, on 24 August 1940 a Dornier Do 17 bomber damaged and on 30 August 1940 two probable Messerschmitt Bf 110s. On 6 September 1940 Beamish claimed two Junkers Ju 87s, on 11 September 1940 a probable Heinkel He 111 bomber, on 15 September 1940 a shared Heinkel He 111 and on 18 September 1940 and 27 September 1940 he scored probable Messerschmitt Bf 109s. Beamish damaged a Messerschmitt Bf 109 on 12 October 1940, on 25 October 1940 he probably destroyed a Messerschmitt Bf 109 and damaged another finally probably shooting down another on 30 October 1940.

Beamish was awarded the Distinguished Service Order on 23 July 1940, when his citation stated:

Beamish was awarded the Distinguished Flying Cross on 8 November 1940, when his citation stated:

On 7 November 1940 Beamish collided with Pilot Officer TF Neil of No. 249 Squadron RAF whilst on patrol and made a forced-landing at Leeds Castle in Kent. In all his sorties in 1940, he was damaged by enemy action three times, on each occasion getting his aircraft down safely.  On 11 November 1940 an attack was carried out by Italian aircraft based in Belgium during which Beamish claimed a probable Fiat CR 42  bi-plane fighter. On 13 November 1940 he damaged a Messerschmitt Bf 109 near Dover. On 10 January 1941 he shot down a Messerschmitt Bf 109 but was posted to HQ No. 11 Group RAF on 17 March 1941. Beamish was unable to fly regularly by now but occasionally flew over occupied Europe and claimed a probable Messerschmitt Bf 109 near Mardyck on 9 August 1941.

Acting Group Captain Beamish was awarded a Bar to the Distinguished Service Order on 2 September 1941, when his citation stated:

Beamish was appointed to command RAF Kenley on 25 January 1942 and was able to fly more frequently with his squadrons. Accompanied by flying ace Wing Commander RF Boyd he took off on the morning of 12 February 1942 on a reconnaissance flight during which they chased two Messerschmitt Bf 109s before sighting part of the German Fleet making its 'Channel Dash'. The ships had been reported ten minutes earlier by two pilots of No. 91 Squadron RAF but the report had not been fully believed until such senior confirmation was received. Attacks were then planned.

On 13 February 1942 Beamish shared in the destruction of a Heinkel He 115 float plane over the Channel. On 9 March 1942 he claimed a Focke-Wulf Fw 190 destroyed claiming a second one and a Messerschmitt Bf 109 on 26 March 1942.

Killed in action
On 28 March 1942 Beamish was leading the Kenley Wing and flying with No. 485 Squadron RAF (New Zealand) when he sighted a formation of Messerschmitt Bf 109s and Focke-Wulf Fw 190s just south of Calais. In the battle which followed Beamish was attacked and damaged by a Messerschmitt Bf 109 and requested a position over the radio before last being seen entering a cloud near Calais.

Awards
 Air Force Cross on 1 January 1938.
 Mentioned in Despatches on 20 February 1940.
 Distinguished Service Order on 23 July 1940.
 Distinguished Flying Cross on 8 November 1940.
 Bar to the Distinguished Service Order on 2 September 1941.

Bibliography

References

1903 births
1942 deaths
Royal Air Force personnel killed in World War II
British World War II flying aces
Companions of the Distinguished Service Order
Graduates of the Royal Air Force College Cranwell
Recipients of the Distinguished Flying Cross (United Kingdom)
Recipients of the Air Force Cross (United Kingdom)
Royal Air Force group captains
The Few
Leicester Tigers players
Wing leaders
People from County Cork